Princeska z napako is a novel by Slovenian author Janja Vidmar. It was first published in 1998.

See also
List of Slovenian novels

References

Slovenian novels
1998 novels